Something Nice from London is a 2013 Zimbabwean British drama film written by Petina Gappah and directed by Nick Marcq. The film stars Munya Chidzonga, Tonderai Munyebvu and Lovewell Chisango in the lead roles while Memory Busoso, Rambidzai Karize and Lauren Marshall play supportive roles. The film is titled ironically as its climax is linked with the untimely death of Peter who dies in London under mysterious circumstances. The film is a joint collaboration of Britain based Latimer Films and British Council. The movie is inspired and adapted from Petina Gappah's short story with the same title which was a part of the award-winning anthology An Elergy For Easterly. The film had its theatrical release on 1 April 2015 coinciding the April Fools' Day but it was screened in few film festivals in late 2013.

Cast 
 Munya Chidzonga as Jonathan
 Memory Busoso as Maimary
 Lovewell Chisango as Uncle Matyaya
 Rambidzai Karize as Mary
 Lauren Marshall as Lisa
 Tonderai Munyebvu as Peter
 Charles Mzembe as Boss Man Dentist
 Pretty Nxaba as Mailisa
 Eddie Sandifolo as Cargoman

Plot 
Tensions rise in Harare as the Chikwiro family await the arrival of their dead son Peter from London. Conflict arises on burying of Peter's body which turns out to be a chaos. Peter's mother insists to bury on a local cemetery but Matyaya and Jonathan are persuading other ideas to consider Shurugwi, the place where Peter's father was buried. Mary's cousin Lisa who is in England then informs the relatives of Peter in Harare that it could take another week to send the body.

Filming 
The film was mostly shot and set in Zimbabwe and few portions of the film were set in London.

References

External links 

 

2013 films
2013 drama films
Zimbabwean drama films
Shona-language films
Films shot in Zimbabwe
Films set in Zimbabwe
Films set in England
Films set in London
2010s English-language films